EMD may refer to:

Finance and commerce 
 Emerging market debt
 Earnest money deposit, in the United States, a security deposit, especially for real estate

Medicine 
 Electromagnetic diaphragm 
 Electromechanical dissociation
 Emergency medical dispatcher
 Enamel matrix derivative
 Esophageal motility disorder
 Merck Group, known as EMD in Canada and the United States, a German pharmaceutical company

Science and technology 
 Electrolytic manganese dioxide
 Emerin
 Empirical mode decomposition
 Equilibrium mode distribution
 ReadyBoost, disk-caching software

Transport 
 East Midlands Parkway railway station, in England
 Electro-Motive Diesel, an American locomotive manufacturer
 Electronic Miscellaneous Document in the airline industry
 Emerald Airport, in Queensland, Australia

Other uses 

 Schneider Electric EMD an Armenian-Serbian electric company
 EMD (band), a Swedish band
 Earth mover's distance
 European Marketing Distribution, a European purchasing organization for grocery stores
 European Maritime Day